Mama Rosa is an American sitcom television series that aired from May 21 until June 11, 1950. (The reference book Encyclopedia of Television Shows, 1925 through 2010 describes the program as a drama.)

Premise
Mama Rosa runs a boardinghouse in Hollywood.

Cast
Anna Demetrio as Mama Rosa
Beverly Garland as Mama's Daughter
Richard Anderson as Mama's Son
Vito Scotti as Nikolai

References

External links
IMDb
TV.com
TV Guide

1950 American television series debuts
1950 American television series endings
1950s American sitcoms
English-language television shows
American Broadcasting Company original programming
Black-and-white American television shows
Television shows set in Los Angeles